Ilha das Flores is a municipality in the state of Sergipe (SE) in Brazil.

References

Municipalities in Sergipe